The 1996–97 Boston Bruins season was the team's 73rd season of operation in the National Hockey League (NHL). The Bruins finished with the worst record in the NHL and missed the Stanley Cup playoffs for the first time since 1967.

Off-season

Regular season

Final standings

Schedule and results

Player statistics

Skaters

Goaltenders

† Denotes player spent time with another team before joining the Bruins. Stats reflect time with the Bruins only.
‡ Denotes player was traded mid-season. Stats reflect time with the Bruins only.

Awards and records

Transactions

Trades

Free agents

Signings

Waivers

Draft picks
Boston's draft picks at the 1996 NHL Entry Draft held at the Kiel Center in St. Louis, Missouri.

Notes
 The Bruins acquired this pick as the result of a trade on August 26, 1994 that sent Glen Wesley to Hartford in exchange for first-round picks in 1995, 1997 and this pick.
 The Bruins acquired this pick as the result of a trade on June 22, 1996 that sent Shawn McEachern to Ottawa in exchange for Trent McCleary and this pick.
 The Bruins acquired this pick as the result of a trade on August 17, 1995 that sent David Shaw to Tampa Bay in exchange for this pick.
Tampa Bay previously acquired this pick as the result of a trade on August 17, 1995 that sent Marc Bergevin and Ben Hankinson to Detroit in exchange for Shawn Burr and this pick.
 The Bruins acquired this pick as the result of a trade on June 21, 1996 that sent Al Iafrate to San Jose in exchange for Jeff Odgers and this pick.
San Jose previously acquired this pick as the result of a trade on March 20, 1996 that sent Kevin Miller to Pittsburgh in exchange for this pick.
 The Bruins first-round pick went to the Edmonton Oilers as the result of a trade on January 11, 1996 that sent Bill Ranford to Boston in exchange for Mariusz Czerkawski, rights to Sean Brown and this pick (19th overall).
 The Bruins third-round pick went to the Pittsburgh Penguins as the result of a trade on August 1, 1995 that sent Shawn McEachern and Kevin Stevens to Boston in exchange for Glen Murray, Bryan Smolinski and this pick (72nd overall).
 The Bruins fourth-round pick went to the New York Islanders as the result of a trade on December 9, 1995 that sent Dean Chynoweth to Boston in exchange for this pick (128th overall).

References
 

Boston Bruins
Boston Bruins
Boston Bruins seasons
Boston Bruins
Boston Bruins
Bruins
Bruins